Dyschirius franzi is a species of ground beetle in the subfamily Scaritinae. It was described by Kult in 1954.

References

franzi
Beetles described in 1954